Abellu (Azerbaijani and , also Romanized as Abellū and Ablalū; also known as Abella, Ābla, and Ablū) is a village in Azghan Rural District, in the Central District of Ahar County, East Azerbaijan Province, Iran. At the 2006 census, its population was 207, in 45 families.

References 

Populated places in Ahar County